The ochre mole-rat (Fukomys ochraceocinereus) is a species of rodent in the family Bathyergidae.
It is found in Central African Republic, Democratic Republic of the Congo, South Sudan, and Uganda.
Its natural habitats are moist savanna, subtropical or tropical dry shrubland, subtropical or tropical dry lowland grassland, caves, and arable land.

References

Woods, C. A. and C. W. Kilpatrick. 2005.  pp 1538–1600 in Mammal Species of the World a Taxonomic and Geographic Reference 3rd ed. D. E. Wilson and D. M. Reeder eds. Smithsonian Institution Press, Washington D.C.

Fukomys
Mammals described in 1864
Taxonomy articles created by Polbot
Taxa named by Theodor von Heuglin